Kokkonen is a Finnish surname. Notable people with the surname include:

Akseli Kokkonen, Norwegian ski jumper
Ere Kokkonen, Finnish film director
Joonas Kokkonen, Finnish composer
Kiti Kokkonen, Finnish actress and author
Lauri Kokkonen, Finnish author and playwright
Marketta Kokkonen, Finnish city manager
Pentti Kokkonen, Finnish ski jumper
Taina Kokkonen, Finnish singer
Terhi Kokkonen, Finnish musician
Veli-Pekka Kokkonen, Finnish high jumper

Finnish-language surnames